Naming names may refer to:

 Informant
 The Hollywood blacklist, during which witnesses denounced alleged communists to investigating committees of Congress
 Naming Names, a 1980 book by Victor Navasky about the Hollywood blacklist